Formula One, abbreviated to F1, is the highest class of open-wheeled auto racing defined by the Fédération Internationale de l'Automobile (FIA), motorsport's world governing body. The "formula" in the name refers to a set of rules to which all participants and cars must conform. The F1 World Championship season consists of a series of races, known as Grands Prix, held usually on purpose-built circuits, and in a few cases on closed city streets. The results of each race are combined to determine two annual World Championships, one for drivers and one for constructors.

Ferrari hold the record for the most Grand Prix victories, having won 242 times. McLaren are second with 183 wins, and Mercedes are third with 125 wins. Nine countries have produced winning constructors; apart from the six countries which are regarded as the major competitors, Canada (Wolf), Ireland (Jordan), and Austria (Red Bull) have constructors that have won races despite not having a large automotive industry, with all three teams being based in the UK. British constructors have won the most Grands Prix, with 16 constructors having won 519 races between them. Italian constructors are second with 264 wins between six constructors. German constructors are third, having won 127 Grands Prix between three constructors. During the first four championship seasons (1950–1953), only Italian constructors won championship races, with the exception of the Indianapolis 500. Five seasons (1973, 1986, 1991, 1992, and 1993) witnessed wins by only British constructors. Since the first win for a British constructor in 1957, British constructors won races in every season until , except . Only one constructor (Benetton) has achieved victories under two different nationalities.

By constructor
All figures correct as of the 2023 Saudi Arabian Grand Prix

By nationality

Notes

References

Bibliography

See also
List of Formula One World Constructors' Champions
List of Formula One constructors
List of Formula One Grand Prix winners

Winners constructors